is a small asteroid, classified as near-Earth object of the Aten group, approximately  in diameter. It was first observed on 23 July 2017, by the robotic ATLAS survey at Mauna Loa Observatory, Hawaii, two days after the object had approached Earth at 0.33 lunar distances on 21 July 2017.

Orbit and classification 

 is a member of the Aten asteroid, a subgroup of near-Earth objects that are located in the zone of influence of Venus. Atens are a much smaller group than the Apollo and Amor asteroids.

The object has an exceptionally low minimum orbital intersection distance with Earth of 29,650 kilometers or 0.077 lunar distances (LD). It orbits the Sun at a distance of 0.77–1.02 AU once every 10 months (309 days; semi-major axis of 0.89 AU). Its orbit has an eccentricity of 0.14 and an inclination of 20° with respect to the ecliptic. The body's observation arc begins with an observation made by the space-based Wide-field Infrared Survey Explorer on 22 July 2017, one day after its close flyby and a day before its official first observation.

Close approaches 

On 21 July 2017, at 03:32 UT, it flew past Earth at a nominal distance of 127,500 kilometers (0.33 LD) with a relative velocity of 10.36 km/s. All future encounters with Earth will occur at a significantly larger distance.

Physical characteristics 

As of 2018, no rotational lightcurve has been obtained from photometric observations. The body's rotation period, pole and shape remain unknown.

Numbering and naming 

This minor planet has neither been numbered nor named by the Minor Planet Center.

References

External links 
 MPEC 2017-O52 : 2017 OO1, Minor Planet Electronic Circular
 List Of Aten Minor Planets (by designation), Minor Planet Center
 Close shave from an undetected asteroid, EarthSky, 25 July 2017 
 Asteroid 2017 OO1 close approach, International Asteroid Warning Network (IAWN)
 Trajectory Diagram, Minor Planet Center
 
 

Minor planet object articles (unnumbered)
Discoveries by ATLAS
20170721
20170723